Gwynn Valley is a children's summer camp in Brevard, North Carolina. The camp serves girls and boys finishing kindergarten through tenth grade. It was founded in 1935 by Mary Gwynn. In 2017 the camp made its own promotional video with the help of Real Digital Productions.

Programs

Main Camp

Main Camp is for children finishing kindergarten through sixth grade. It is divided into Hillside and Brookside, two cabin areas at opposite ends of the main camp facilities. There are 8-10 campers and two counselors (occasionally also interns and SITs) to a cabin, of which there are roughly twenty-five.

Hillside boys cabins are: Echo, Primavera, Raccoon Ridge, Chipmunk Hut, and Aching Legs.

Hillside girls cabins are: Playhouse, Peter Pan, Mountainview, Island Ford, and Connestee Cove.

Brookside boys cabins are: Chestnut Hollow, 7th Heaven, Raine's Cove, and Possum Manor.

Brookside girls cabins are:  Dancing Waters, Meadow Brook, Running River, Firefly Cove, Rosebay, and Blue Ridge.

(Cabins listed in order of age from youngest to oldest.)

Main Camp has a variety of activities, including:
Flour mill
Horseback riding
Farm with crops and farm animals
Waterfront activities (lake, pool, tubing, kayaking, etc.)
Climbing (including real rock, wall, tree and arborist climbing)
Sports (archery, volleyball, tetherball, soccer, lacrosse etc.)
Mountain Biking 
Fine arts
Pioneer crafts (basketry, weaving, leatherwork, gourd art, pottery)
Texture crafts (Tie-dyeing, candlemaking, beaded bracelets, nature crafts, papermaking)
Nature walks
Outdoor skills

Mountainside (Strong Side)

Mountainside is for children finishing sixth, seventh, or eighth grades. It is a short way from main camp, and consists of five cabins, two boys and three girls (Sunrise, Laurelwood, Summerset, Walnut Run, Wild Wood). There are 10 campers and 2 counselors to a cabin, also possibly an intern.

Mountainsiders have opportunities to do some of the Main Camp activities, but are (except for meals) separate from Main Campers, practicing for and going on Adventures. The first week, all campers will go on one-day mini-adventures, one in each of four areas (canoeing, rock climbing, mountain biking, pioneering). The second week, each camper chooses one of the four adventures and spends three days learning and practicing the necessary skills. The third week, all campers spend 3½ days on their chosen adventure.

Riverside 
Riverside is for teens finishing eighth and ninth grades. It is entirely separated from Main Camp and consists of two cabins, one male, one female (Joe Pye (M), Indian Paintbrush (F)). There are twelve campers in both cabins total, 6 girls and 6 boys, and one counselor per cabin. Riversiders' cabins are located near The Center, where the kitchen, bathroom, and showerhouse are.

Riversides also participate in adventures; however, they set out on four-day adventures in three different areas (backpacking, white water canoeing, and rock climbing). The remainder of the three weeks are spent preparing for the adventures, participating in  service projects, and building the inter-camper community.

Sessions

Main Camp

There are five (or, alternatively, six) Main Camp sessions: A, B, C (also C1 and C2), D, and E. Session A is a 7-day session in early to mid June for finishing K-6. Session B is a 13-day session in mid to late June for finishing K-6. Session C is a 20-day session in July for finishing K-6. Session C1 is a 10-day session in early to mid July during the first half of C for finishing K-6. Session C2 is a 10-day session in mid to late July during the second half of C for finishing K-6. Session E is an 8-day session in early to mid June for finishing K-6. Campers may also stay for more than one session.

Mountainside

There are four Mountainside sessions: MS1-A, MS1-B, MS2, and MS3. Sessions MS1-A and B are 1½-week sessions that attempt to provide a condensed version of Mountainside ("Taste of Mountainside") in June. Session MS2 is a 3-week session during most of July. Session MS3 is a 3-week session during the end of July and most of August.

Riverside

There are three Riverside sessions: RS1, RS2 and RS3. RS1 is a three-week session in June. RS2 is a three-week session during most of July. RS3 is a three-week session during the end of July and most of August.

References

External Links

Summer camps in North Carolina
Buildings and structures in Transylvania County, North Carolina
1935 establishments in North Carolina